The 43rd World Science Fiction Convention (Worldcon), also known as Aussiecon Two, was held on 22–26 August 1985 at the Southern Cross, Victoria, and Sheraton Hotels in Melbourne, Australia.

The convention was chaired by David Grigg.

Participants 

Attendance was 1,599.

Guests of Honour 

 Gene Wolfe (pro)
 Ted White (fan)

Awards

1985 Hugo Awards 

 Best Novel: Neuromancer by William Gibson
 Best Novella: PRESS ENTER■ by John Varley
 Best Novelette: "Bloodchild" by Octavia Butler
 Best Short Story: "The Crystal Spheres" by David Brin
 Best Non-Fiction Book: Wonder's Child: My Life in Science Fiction by Jack Williamson
 Best Dramatic Presentation: 2010
 Best Professional Editor: Terry Carr
 Best Professional Artist: Michael Whelan
 Best Semiprozine: Locus, edited by Charles N. Brown
 Best Fanzine: File 770, edited by Mike Glyer
 Best Fan Writer: Dave Langford
 Best Fan Artist: Alexis Gilliland

Other awards 

 John W. Campbell Award for Best New Writer: Lucius Shepard

See also 

 Aussiecon One (1975)
 Aussiecon Three (1999)
 Hugo Award
 Science fiction
 Speculative fiction
 World Science Fiction Society
 Worldcon

References

External links 

 NESFA.org: The Long List
 NESFA.org: 1985 convention notes 
 Hugo.org: 1985 Hugo Awards

1980s in Melbourne
1985 conferences
1985 in Australia
Science fiction conventions in Australia
Worldcon